Nancy Jane Cox is an American television journalist and news anchor for WLEX-TV in Lexington, Kentucky. She was also Miss Kentucky 1990.

Biography
Nancy Cox anchors LEX 18 News at 5:00, 6:00, and 7:00. She joined LEX 18 in July 1992. She attended both Campbellsville University in Campbellsville in Taylor County, Kentucky and Western Kentucky University in Bowling Green, having graduated in 1990. She won the titles of Miss Bowling Green and Miss Kentucky in 1990 and participated in Miss America 1991 on September 7, 1990. Cox is a sister of Ricky L. Cox, former member of the Kentucky House of Representatives.

Nancy has won eight Emmy Awards from the Ohio Valley chapter of the National Academy of Television Arts and Sciences and two Edward R. Murrow Regional awards. Cox has a son and a daughter and resides in Lexington.

References

External links
 Nancy Cox on Facebook
 
 LEX 18's Nancy Cox

1967 births
Living people
American television news anchors
Campbellsville University alumni
Beauty pageants in Kentucky
Miss America 1991 delegates
People from Campbellsville, Kentucky
People from Lexington, Kentucky
Western Kentucky University alumni
Miss Kentucky winners
Kentucky women news anchors
American women television journalists
21st-century American women